Super Snooper may refer to:
Snooper and Blabber, a segment of the 1959 animated series The Quick Draw McGraw Show
Super Fuzz, a 1980 Italian superhero comedy film by Sergio Corbucci